Felipe Cervera Hernández (born 1 December 1975) is a Mexican politician from the Institutional Revolutionary Party. From 2009 to 2012 he served as Deputy of the LXI Legislature of the Mexican Congress representing Yucatán.

References

1975 births
Living people
Politicians from Yucatán (state)
People from Mérida, Yucatán
Institutional Revolutionary Party politicians
21st-century Mexican politicians
Universidad Autónoma de Yucatán alumni
Members of the Congress of Yucatán
Deputies of the LXI Legislature of Mexico
Members of the Chamber of Deputies (Mexico) for Yucatán